The Johns Hopkins–Syracuse lacrosse rivalry is an intercollegiate lacrosse rivalry between the Johns Hopkins Blue Jays and Syracuse Orange. The two programs are the most historically successful and winningest in collegiate lacrosse, combining for 60 national titles spanning the pre-NCAA and NCAA eras. Since the advent of the NCAA Division I Men's Lacrosse Championship, the Syracuse and Johns Hopkins have the first- and second-most titles respectively. Hopkins leads the series 32–28–1 through 2023.

Series history

Early years and rise to prominence 
The teams first met in 1921 after a hard-fought 4–4 draw. After several more contests in the 1920s and 1930s, they would not meet again until 1963, 29 years after their last meeting. The 60s resulted in five more Hopkins victories and the series did not develop sustained national significance until 1980. That season, the teams met in the NCAA Final Four, the first of 13 meetings between the two in the tournament. The Blue Jays won that initial postseason matchup 18 to 11 en route to its third consecutive national championship. Syracuse would grab its first victory since 1922 with a title showdown three years later, the first national title for the Orange since 1957. The teams would meet again the following year in the championship, with Hopkins prevailing 13–10. After this streak of significant matchups, the two athletics programs scheduled an annual game in the regular season, which has continued uninterrupted to this day. Following that Jays victory, Hopkins again prevailed in the third consecutive title game between the two in a strong 11–4 showing. 1986 snapped the streak of postseason meetings and Hopkins' nine consecutive title game trips, as both teams were felled in the Final Four. Syracuse took three of the next four meetings before the two capped the decade with a classic title game in 1989. The Orange defeated the Jays 13–12 behind the Gaits brothers Paul and Gary. The programs would meet again in the postseason in following years, with Syracuse taking four out of five contests in the 1990s and early 2000s. After splitting the 90s with six wins apiece, the Jays would win seven of the next twelve prior to 2008. Hopkins and the Orange would square off in the 2008 title game, the first between the two since 1989. The fifth game featured the Orange claiming their tenth NCAA title. Beginning with the 2008 season, Syracuse won eight of nine contests in a dominant stretch.

Recent years (2010s to present) 
The two programs, long proudly independent, would react to changing conditions in the collegiate lacrosse landscape during the 2010s. The significance of conference postseason tournaments in obtaining postseason bids, along with primary conference obligations for the Orange, led both to give up their independence. Syracuse joined its primary home, the Big East Conference in 2010, before lateraling to the ACC in 2014. Hopkins began exploring membership possibilities in 2013 after missing its first NCAA tournament since the inaugural contest, which broke the longest streak in history at 41 straight seasons. In 2013, the university announced that Hopkins would join the newly formed Big Ten Conference as an affiliate member for lacrosse, beginning with the 2015 season. On the field, Hopkins would snap the aforementioned Syracuse streak with a victory in the quarterfinals of the 2015 NCAA Division I Men's Lacrosse Championship. The teams split the next four before Syracuse took the first contest of the 2020s with a 15–9 victory in Baltimore.

Rival accomplishments
The following summarizes the accomplishments of the two programs.

Due to NCAA violations, Syracuse was forced to vacate its 1990 NCAA title and tournament appearance.

Game results

References

College lacrosse rivalries in the United States
Johns Hopkins Blue Jays men's lacrosse
Syracuse Orange men's lacrosse